Ružiná is a village and municipality in the Lučenec District in the Banská Bystrica Region of Slovakia. The town's attractions include the Ružiná dam and the Divín Castle. The town is home to the Church of St. František Assiský-the oldest building in the town, dating back to the mid-18th century.

References

External links
 
 
http://www.statistics.sk/mosmis/eng/run.html

Villages and municipalities in Lučenec District